Tiracola plagiata, the cacao armyworm, is a moth of the family Noctuidae. The species was first described by Francis Walker in 1857. It is found from south-east Asia, South India, Sri Lanka, Myanmar to the South Pacific Islands, including the northern two-thirds of Australia.

Description

The wingspan is about 60 mm. Antennae of male minutely ciliated. Forewings with strongly toothed cilia. Body pale greyish brown and abdomen fuscous. Forewings often suffused with red brown and irrorated (sprinkled) with dark brown. There is an antemedial waved indistinct line which is often obsolete. Orbicular also obsolete, whereas reniform almost obsolete, ochreous or fuscous, sometimes on a dark patch. There are traces of a postmedial curved series of black specks. A submarginal doubly curved ochreous line can be seen, accompany with a marginal black specks series as well. Hindwings are fuscous with whitish cilia.

Larva dull violet brown with a few fine dorsal hairs. A few scattered grey dots and a sub-lateral pale olivaceous band from fourth somite. Head and legs violet grey. Head small and anal somite conical. Pupa dark red.

Ecology
It is an international fruit pest, particularly for Musa acuminata, a species of banana. Larvae have also been recorded on other plants, including Dioscorea species, Diplocyclos palmatus, Toona australis, Eucalyptus, Portulaca oleracea, Phytolacca octandra Theobroma cacao, Coffea arabica, and Physalis ixocarpa.

References

External links
Redescription of the Genus and Species Tiracola plagiata
First report of Tiracola plagiata Walker (Lepidoptera: Noctuidae) attacking Dolichos bean, Lablab purpureus L. from India

Hadeninae
Moths of Asia
Moths of Japan
Moths of New Zealand